The European Cup Winners Cup Club Championship was a championship tournament between national club cup winners for men's softball teams in Europe, governed by the European Softball Federation.  If a cup tournament was not held the tournament was also open for the runner up of the national championship. After the 2011 season, the ESF Cup Winners Cup merged with the ESF European Cup to form the European Men's Super Cup Championship. From 2012 the Super Cup is the only European championship for club teams.

Results

Medal table

References

External links
European Softball Federation

European Softball Championship
Multi-national professional sports leagues